There are two schools named Annenberg School for Communication. 

University of Southern California Annenberg School for Communication and Journalism
Annenberg School for Communication at the University of Pennsylvania